Quintano is a comune (municipality) in the Province of Cremona in the Italian region Lombardy, located about  east of Milan and about  northwest of Cremona.

Quintano borders the following municipalities: Capralba, Casaletto Vaprio, Pieranica, Torlino Vimercati, Trescore Cremasco.

References

Cities and towns in Lombardy